is a passenger railway station located in the city of Ono, Hyōgo Prefecture, Japan, operated by the private Kobe Electric Railway (Shintetsu).

Lines

Station layout
The station consists of two ground-level island platforms connected by an elevated station building.

Platforms

Adjacent stations

History
It was renamed to its present name on April 1, 1988. The current station building was completed in April 1991.

Passenger statistics
In fiscal 2019, the station was used by an average of 1753 passengers daily.

Surrounding area
 Ono Municipal Yoshikokan
Hyogo Prefectural Ono High School
Hyogo Prefectural Ono Technical High School
Ono City Ono Junior High School
Ono City Ono Elementary School

See also
List of railway stations in Japan

References

External links

 Official website (Kobe Electric Railway) 

Railway stations in Japan opened in 1951
Railway stations in Hyōgo Prefecture
Ono, Hyōgo